There are several different versions of PC Magazine. The UK edition was taken over by VNU in 2000 and ceased publication in 2002, although they still maintain a website.

Its columnists moved to Personal Computer World, the first British computer magazine.

PC Magazine UK's launch edition was in April 1992, and the launch event, in March, was on a scale that no other technology magazine had experienced before or since, and was typical of the way publisher Ziff-Davis conducted business over the nine years it remained in the UK.

Nine months prior to the launch, David Craver, head of Ziff-Davis UK, started recruiting technology journalists and columnists. Peter Jackson and Guy Kewney were star columnists, called fellows. Steve Malone was the launch editor, Jerry Sanders was Executive Editor in charge of reviews, and Ed Henning created ZD Labs UK, the technical backbone of the reviews.

References

External links
 PCMag UK online

1992 establishments in the United Kingdom
2002 disestablishments in the United Kingdom
Defunct computer magazines published in the United Kingdom
Magazines established in 1992
Magazines disestablished in 2002